Lakeesha Rarere, (born 9 June 1997 in New Zealand) is a professional squash player who represented Australia. She reached a career-high world ranking of World No. 75 in January 2016.

References

External links 

Australian female squash players
Living people
1997 births
21st-century Australian women